The Blue Hole is located in the Pinelands of Monroe Township, Gloucester County, New Jersey and Winslow Township, Camden County, New Jersey. It is a clear blue body of water situated in the middle of a dense forest, with many similar such lakes in its immediate vicinity. The water has warm and cold spots, averaging 58 to 60 degrees Fahrenheit. The lake's color is unusual, as most lakes and ponds in the area are brownish due to large deposits of bog iron and the presence of tannic acid. In the 1930s, the Blue Hole was a popular party and swimming spot. A wooden footbridge over the Great Egg Harbor River that once made the Hole easily accessible was wiped out by a storm in the 1960s; now it can only be reached on foot.

The Blue Hole has been largely abandoned. Locals still go to the area and use it as a party spot. There are many other 'blue holes' in the immediate vicinity, as well as quicksand and other seasonal ponds and lakes that form from springs seeping from high water table levels. The Blue Hole is not to be confused with the numerous former quarries in the area, which are much larger and have a vibrant sky blue color.

At its deepest point, the Blue Hole is  The bottom appears to consist of sand rather than mud. Swimming and diving in the Blue Hole are both illegal, but not enforced . It remains a popular swimming spot during the summer.

In popular culture
A number of legends exist about Blue Hole, such that it is bottomless with powerful currents, that the water is freezing cold year-round, and that the Jersey Devil is active in the area. 

Jersey Odysseys: Legend of the Blue Hole is a short horror film directed and written by James Rolfe. It was originally supposed to be the pilot episode for a web series based on urban legends and myths of New Jersey, but James became more involved with his Angry Video Game Nerd web series when it became popular, and did not have the time to shoot any more new episodes. However, he claims that he still wants to revisit the series and produce more episodes someday.

References

External links 
Weird NJ's Legends of the Blue Hole
Trip report (maps, photos, directions)
Inquirer Suburban Story on the Blue Hole
Great Directions and Jersey Devil related lore

Bodies of water of Camden County, New Jersey
Bodies of water of Gloucester County, New Jersey
Lakes of New Jersey
Landforms of the Pine Barrens (New Jersey)
Winslow Township, New Jersey
Pine Barrens (New Jersey)